Formidable was an 80-gun ship of the line of the French Navy, launched in 1751.

Career 
In 1754, Formidable was under Duchaffault, part of a squadron under Mac Nemara.

She fought at the Battle of Quiberon Bay on 20 November 1759, where she served as the flagship of Saint André du Vergé.  captured her at the battle and the Admiralty commissioned her in the Royal Navy as the Third Rate HMS Formidable.

Fate
Formidable was broken up in 1768.

In popular culture
The Formidable appears as a legendary ship fought in the 2014 video game Assassin's Creed: Rogue  at the Battle of Quiberon Bay. In contrast to the game, the ship was sunk by the protagonist Shay Cormac with his ship, the Morrigan, instead of being captured by the Royal Navy. Like all men-of-war in the game, the ship is a 116-gun first rate ship of the line, contrary to its real world counterpart.

Sources and references 
 Notes

References

 Bibliography
Lavery, Brian (2003) The Ship of the Line - Volume 1: The development of the battlefleet 1650–1850. Conway Maritime Press. .
 

Formidable (1751)
Ships of the line of the Royal Navy
1751 ships